Bensouda is a surname. Notable people with the surname include:

Fatou Bensouda (born 1961), Gambian lawyer and international criminal law prosecutor
Nabiha Bensouda, Danish singer-songwriter
Noureddine Bensouda (born 1963), Moroccan civil servant